Zone defense is a type of defense, used in team sports, which is the alternative to man-to-man defense; instead of each player guarding a corresponding player on the other team, each defensive player is given an area (a zone) to cover.

A zone defense can be used in many sports where defensive players guard players on the other team. Zone defenses and zone principles are commonly used in association football, American football, Australian rules football, basketball, ice hockey, lacrosse, netball and ultimate among others.

Basketball
The names given to zone defenses start with the number of players on the front of the zone (farthest from the goal) followed by the numbers of players in the rear zones. For example, in a 2–3 zone two defenders cover areas in the top of the zone (near the top of the key) while three defenders cover areas near the baseline.

Match-up zone is a hybrid man-to-man and zone defense in which players apply man-to-man defense to whichever opposing player enters their area. John Chaney, former head coach of Temple University, is the most famous proponent of this defense.  Hybrid defenses also include Box-and-one, in which four defenders are in a 2–2 zone and one defender guards a specific player on the offense. A variant of this is triangle-and-two, in which three defenders are in a 2–1 zone and two defenders guard two specific offensive players.

Zone defenses are common in international, college, and youth competition. In the National Basketball Association, zone defenses were prohibited until the 2001–2002 season, and most teams do not use them as a primary defensive strategy. The NBA has a defensive three-second violation rule which was also introduced with the 2001–2002 season, which makes it more difficult for teams to play zone, since such defenses usually position a player in the middle of the key to stop penetration. The Dallas Mavericks under coach Rick Carlisle are an example of an NBA team that have regularly used zone defenses.

History of basketball zone defense

Frank Lindley, Newton (Kansas) High School basketball coach from 1914 to 1945, was among the first to use the zone defense and other innovations in the game and authored numerous books about basketball. He finished his career with a record of 594–118 and guided the Railroaders to ten state titles and seven second-place finishes. Jim Boeheim, coach of the Syracuse Orange men's basketball team, is famous for using a 2–3 zone that is among the best in the NCAA. His zone, which typically features athletic, disruptive, and aggressive defenders, has become a prototype for use on other teams including the United States men's national basketball team, where he has spent time as an assistant coach.

Advantages

Some of the reasons for using a zone defense are:
 
 The opposing team has a player/players too fast (in the case of guards) or too big (in the case of forwards or centers) for man-to-man defense to be effective.
 Many zones pack defenders in the lane but allow the offensive team to take long-range shots. If the opponents are poor long-range shooters, a zone can be very effective, simultaneously allowing for defensive rebounds.
 Unless trapping is involved, zone defenses typically do not involve aggressive pressure on the ball handler and allow the offensive team to easily pass the ball around the perimeter. This can allow the offense to use more time before a shot is attempted, an advantage for teams wanting to slow the tempo of a game.
 A poor defensive player can often be "hidden" in a zone because teammates can more easily help if he or she is beaten.
 A zone can help players in danger of fouling out by taking pressure off them.
 Playing a zone is less tiring and thus can help teams suffering from fatigue.
 To prevent easy scores when the ball is in-bounded under the basket.
 Against teams with inexperienced guards, trapping zones can disrupt the offense and force turnovers

Disadvantages

Playing a zone entails some risks.

 Zones tend to be weak on the perimeter, so they are not very effective against teams with good outside shooters.
 Zones have gaps (areas that are not well-covered by defenders) that can be exploited by teams that pass well or have guards capable of penetrating the zone.
 If a team is behind in the game, playing a zone can be a poor strategy because zones usually allow the offense to take more time off the clock on each possession, which limits the time remaining for the losing team to reduce the lead. It also reduces the chances of stealing the ball from the attackers and attempting a quick counterstrike across open field.  This is not always true; there are pressure zone defenses that can often cause quicker shots by the opponent or result in turnovers.
 When a shot is attempted, it is often harder for players in a zone to find counterparts to box out for the rebound, which sometimes results in an offensive player getting an easy offensive rebound.
 Zone defenses require a commitment to scheming and practicing zone, both from coaches and players. While most players are familiar with playing zone defense, they are sometimes not expert in the nuances of the zone, such as spacing, which require familiarity and experience. When man-to-man teams switch to the zone defense, it is sometimes seen as a gimmick that is easily exploited by disciplined teams.

Attacking a zone defense

While strategies for countering zone defenses vary and often depend on the strengths and weaknesses of both the offensive and defensive teams, there are some general principles that are typically used by offensive teams when facing a zone.

 Many popular zones (such as the 2–3, 3–2 and 1–2–2) have a gap in the middle of the lane. Getting the ball in this area can be very effective because the defense is often forced to "collapse" on the ball handler, freeing up other players for open shots. To exploit this gap, many teams assign a forward to operate in the "high post" area near the free throw line to catch and distribute the ball. A forward in the high post area can also set screens on the players at the top of the zone to allow penetration by the guards.
 Quick passing is an important element of attacking any zone. The defense will shift as the ball moves, but if the offense can move the ball faster than the defense can react, open shots can result. Quick passing against a zone often leads to open three-point shots, and zone defenses are less effective against teams with good three-point shooters.
 Dribble penetration is very effective in breaking down a zone. If a guard can dribble into the gaps in the zone, multiple defenders must converge on the ball. The ball handler can then often pass to an open teammate for a shot. This strategy illustrates why preventing dribble penetration is important in playing an effective zone defense.
 Passing the ball to the interior of the zone can have similar effects as dribble penetration: as the defense collapses, a quick kick-out to the perimeter can result in either an open shot or continued quick passing, as the defense is now imbalanced.
 Short Corner: Attacking the "Short Corner", or baseline area behind the defense outside the lane, against a 2–3 zone puts the defense in rotation and opens up the mid post.
 Screening the backside of the zone: this opens up weakside shooters off a skip pass or ball rotation.

American football

A zone defense in American football is a type of "pass coverage". See American football defensive strategy and zone blocking.

Australian rules football
The zone defence tactic, borrowed from basketball, was introduced into Australian football in the late 1980s by Robert Walls and revolutionized the game. It was used most effectively by Essendon Football Club coach Kevin Sheedy.

The tactic is used from the fullback kick in after a behind is scored. The side in opposition to the player kicking in places their forward players, including their full-forward and centre half forward, in evenly spaced zones in the back 50-metre arc. This makes it easier for them to block leading players and forces the kick-in to be more precise, in effect increasing the margin for error which can cause a turnover and another shot at goal. As a result, the best ways to break the zone are for the full-back to bomb it long (over 50 meters), often requiring a low percentage torpedo punt, or to play a short chipping game out of defence and then to switch play as opposition players break the zone. The latter has negated the effectiveness of the tactic since the 1990s.

Another kick-in technique is the huddle, often used before the zone, which involves all of the players from the non-kicking team huddling together and then breaking in different directions. The kicker typically aims in whichever direction the designated target (typically the ruckman) runs in.

Ice hockey
In ice hockey, players defend zones in the neutral zone trap and left wing lock.

Lacrosse
In lacrosse, a zone defense is not as often as the normal man defense. It has been used effectively at the D-III level by schools such as Wesleyan University. They almost always use a 6-man “backer” zone, where they have three guys up top and three guys down low and they try to stay in their zone and not rotate as much as possible.  When teams are man down, many teams employ a “box and one” zone defense, where the four outside players stay in their designated zone while the fifth player follows the ball while staying on the crease man.

Netball
Netball is a sport similar to basketball with similar strategies and tactics employed, although with seven players per team. Zone defense is one of the main defensive strategies employed by teams, along with one-on-one defense. Common variants include center-court block, box-and-two zone, diamond-and-two zone, box-out zone and split-circle zone.

Ultimate

Ultimate allows for a number of zone defence tactics, usually employed in poor (such as windy, rainy or snowy) conditions, to discourage long passes and slow the progress of the opposition's movement.

See also
 Box-and-one defense
 Man-to-man defense
 Zonal marking

References

Australian rules football tactics
Australian rules football terminology
Basketball strategy
Basketball terminology
Ice hockey strategy
Ice hockey terminology
Lacrosse terminology
Military tactics
Netball terminology
Water polo strategy
Water polo terminology